Betty Stubbings was an England international lawn and indoor bowler.

Bowls career
Stubbings was an England International from 1978 until 1992 and won double gold in the fours with Eileen Fletcher, Mavis Steele, Gloria Thomas and Irene Molyneux and the team event (Taylor Trophy) at the 1981 World Outdoor Bowls Championship in Toronto. Four years later she won a bronze medal in the fours.

Stubbings also won two bronze medals at the Commonwealth Games and won the National Title in 1977.

References

English female bowls players
2015 deaths
Commonwealth Games medallists in lawn bowls
Commonwealth Games bronze medallists for England
Bowls World Champions
Bowls players at the 1982 Commonwealth Games
Bowls players at the 1986 Commonwealth Games
Date of birth missing
Medallists at the 1982 Commonwealth Games
Medallists at the 1986 Commonwealth Games